Police units in the United States tend to use a tactical designator (or tactical callsign) consisting of a letter of the police radio alphabet followed by one or two numbers.  For example, "Mary One" might identify the head of a city's homicide division.  Police and fire department radio systems are assigned official callsigns, however.  Examples are KQY672 and KYX556.  The official headquarters callsigns are usually announced at least hourly, and more frequently by Morse code.

The United States Army uses tactical designators that change daily.  They normally consist of letter-number-letter prefixes identifying a unit, followed by a number-number suffix identifying the role of the person using the callsign.

Military communications
Law enforcement in the United States